Det store løb is a 1952 Danish family film directed by Alice O'Fredericks.

Cast
Poul Reichhardt as Niels Stone
Grethe Holmer as Kirsten Hein
Ib Schønberg as Dr. Hessel
Johannes Meyer - Godsejer Vilhelm Stone
Katy Valentin as Fru Helene Stone
Lisbeth Movin as Gerda Hein
Per Buckhøj as Henrik Hein
Valdemar Skjerning as Sagfører Hemme
William Rosenberg as Claus Hemme
Helga Frier as Baronessen på Stensholt
Peter Malberg as Træneren Nich
Olaf Nordgreen as Hestepasser Kølle
Agnes Rehni as Jomfru Madsen
Else Jarlbak as Stuepige
Lis Weibel as Hjælpepigen Jensine
Vera Tørresø as En pige
Birgitte Bruun as Spejderpige
Knud Schrøder as Kontrolant på travbanen
Henry Nielsen as DSB medarbejder
Ove Sprogøe as Drunk man in bus

External links

1952 films
1950s Danish-language films
Danish black-and-white films
Films directed by Alice O'Fredericks
Films scored by Sven Gyldmark